The ninth season of The Bachelor Australia premiered on 21 July 2021. This season features Jimmy Nicholson, a 31-year-old aeroplane pilot from Sydney, New South Wales.

Contestants
The season began with 23 contestants.

Call-out order

 The contestant received the business lounge key, which guarantees one Bachelorette uninterrupted time with Jimmy during their time in the mansion.
 The contestant received a rose during the date
 The contestant received a rose outside of a date or the rose ceremony.
 The contestant was eliminated
 The contestant was eliminated outside the rose ceremony
 The contestant was eliminated during the date
 The contestant quit the competition
 The contestant won the competition

Notes

Episodes

Episode 1
Original airdate: 21 July 2021

Episode 2
Original airdate: 22 July 2021

Episode 3
Original airdate: 28 July 2021

Episode 4
Original airdate: 29 July 2021

Episode 5
Original airdate: 4 August 2021

Episode 6
Original airdate: 5 August 2021

Episode 7
Original airdate: 11 August 2021

Episode 8
Original airdate: 12 August 2021

Episode 9
Original airdate: 12 August 2021

Episode 10
Original airdate: 18 August 2021

Episode 11
Original airdate: 18 August 2021

Episode 12
Original airdate: 19 August 2021

Episode 13
Original airdate: 25 August 2021

Episode 14
Original airdate: 26 August 2021

Episode 15
Original airdate: 1 September 2021

Episode 16
Original airdate: 2 September 2021

Ratings

Notes

References

Australian (season 09)
2021 Australian television seasons
Television shows filmed in Australia